Mount Dromore is a summit in Alberta, Canada located in the Maligne River Valley at the head of Dromore Creek.

Named by M.P. Bridgland in 1916, Mount Dromore takes its name from Dromore, in Ireland.

References

Dromore
Alberta's Rockies